The premier of the Republic of China, officially the president of the Executive Yuan (Chinese: 行政院院長), is the head of the government of the Republic of China of Taiwan and leader of the Executive Yuan. The premier is nominally the principal advisor to the president of the republic and positioned as the head of central government.

The predecessor of the president of the Executive Yuan was the prime minister of the Republic of China, and the first president of the Executive Yuan was Tan Yanqi; the first president after the constitution was Weng Wenhao; and the first president to take office after the government moved to power was Chen Cheng. Currently, the premier is appointed by the president without approval by the Legislative Yuan. 

The current president of the Executive Yuan is incumbent Chen Chien-jen, who took office in his first term on 31 January 2023.

History

Prior to the establishment of the Executive Yuan in 1928, the premier of the ROC was created as Premier of the Cabinet in 1912. It was changed to the Secretary of State in 1914 and Premier of State Council in 1916 in the Beiyang Government. In 1928, the Kuomintang (KMT) Government established the Executive Yuan and Tan Yankai served as the first president of the Executive Yuan.

Powers and responsibilities
The premier presides over the Executive Yuan Council, which makes up the official cabinet. The vice premier, ministers, and chairpersons of the Executive Yuan Council are appointed by the president on the recommendation of the premier. The premier's official duties also include presenting administrative policies and reports to the legislators, responding to the interpellations of legislators (much like Question Time in some parliamentary systems), and, with the approval of the president, asking the legislators to reconsider its resolutions. Laws and decrees promulgated by the president must also be countersigned by the premier.

In the event of vacancies in both the presidency and the vice presidency, the premier serves as acting president of the republic for up to three months.

One-third of the legislators may initiate a no-confidence vote against the premier. If approved with simple majority, the premier must resign from office within ten days and at the same time may request that the president dissolve the Legislative Yuan. If the motion fails, another no-confidence motion against the same premier cannot be initiated for one year. This power has never been used. In practice, the president has enough legitimacy and executive authority to govern in the face of a legislature controlled by the opposition, and would likely respond to a vote of no-confidence by nominating another person with similar views.

Premier as head of government 
The Constitution of the Republic of China did not originally define strictly the relation between the premier and the president of the Republic and it was not clear whether the government would lean towards a presidential system or parliamentary system when divided. Power shifted to Premier Chiang Ching-kuo after President Chiang Kai-shek's death but shifted to the presidency again when Chiang Ching-kuo became president. After President Lee Teng-hui succeeded Chiang as president in 1988, the power struggle within the Kuomintang extended to the constitutional debate over the relationship between the president and the premier. The first three premiers under Lee, Yu Kuo-hwa, Lee Huan and Hau Pei-tsun, were mainlanders who had initially opposed Lee's ascension to power. The appointment of Lee and Hau were compromises by President Lee to placate the conservative mainlander faction in the party. The subsequent appointment of premier Lien Chan was taken as a sign of Lee's consolidation of power. Moreover, during this time, the power of the premier to approve the president's appointments and the power of the Legislative Council to confirm the president's choice of premier was removed (out of fears that the Democratic Progressive Party would one day gain control of the legislature), clearly establishing the president as the more powerful position of the two.

The relationship between the premier and the legislature again became a contentious issue after the 2000 Presidential election, which led to the election of the Democratic Progressive Party's Chen Shui-bian to the presidency, while the legislature remained under a Kuomintang-led-Pan-Blue majority. Initially, President Chen Shui-bian appointed Tang Fei, a member of the Kuomintang, to the premiership; however, this arrangement proved unworkable, and subsequent appointments were from the Democratic Progressive Party. The established constitutional convention is that the premier is responsible to the president and does not have any responsibility to the legislature other than to report on his activities. However, the Pan-Blue Coalition of the Kuomintang and its coalition partners contended that Chen's actions were unconstitutional, and proposed to name its own choice of premier. There are calls for a constitutional amendment to better define the relationship between the executive and legislative branches of government.

See also

List of premiers of the Republic of China
President of the Republic of China
Politics of the Republic of China
Elections in the Republic of China

References

External links 
 

 01
 01
Premier
Heads of government in Asia
Premier
Chinese government officials